Guangzhou–Foshan–Zhaoqing intercity railway, also known as Guangfozhao intercity railway or Foshan–Zhaoqing intercity railway, is a regional railway within Guangdong province, China. It connects the provincial capital of Guangzhou with Zhaoqing, via Foshan. It is a part of the Pearl River Delta Metropolitan Region intercity railway network. It commenced operations on March 30, 2016.

Overview
Between Guangzhou and Foshan, the line has a westerly heading. From Foshan West railway station, the line continues west through Shishan Town in Nanhai District, across Shishan Industrial Park, over the Guangzhou–Zhuhai railway and entering Sanshui District. The line then crosses the Bei River and passes through the Zhaoqing High-tech Industrial Development Zone. The line then turns southwest, crossing the Sui river, the Guangzhou–Maoming Railway and State Road 321, and passes through Dinghu District before reaching Zhaoqing. The line has 19 stations, 8 between Guangzhou and Foshan, and 11 between Foshan and Zhaoqing. The line is connected to the Guiyang–Guangzhou high-speed railway and the Nanning–Guangzhou high-speed railway.

History
Construction of the Foshan and Sanshui segments of the line started on September 29, 2009 and June 18, 2010 respectively. As of April 20, 2011, the planned terminus was tentatively set at Dachong railway station.
On March 8, 2012 the line was renamed from "Foshan–Zhaoqing intercity railway" to "Guangzhou–Zhaoqing intercity railway". Plans for the line were also revised, extending the line to Guangzhou South railway station.
In July 2012, the plans were revised yet again, with the line being extended to Zhaoqing railway station. The route for this section was determined by September 2012.
Construction of the Dachong elevated viaduct started on December 18, 2012, and construction of the Guangzhou-Foshan segment of the line started in 2013. The line commenced operations on March 30, 2016.

On 10 April 2021, service patterns were changed and through running between Zhaoqing and Shenzhen Airport was introduced.

Stations
 The line shares tracks with the Guangfo Circular & Foguan intercity railways between Panyu and Foshan West.

References

Pearl River Delta
Rapid transit in China
High-speed railway lines in China
Rail transport in Guangdong
Railway lines opened in 2016